Sameridine is a 4-phenylpiperidine derivative that is related to the opioid analgesic drug pethidine (meperidine).

Sameridine has an unusual pharmacological profile, being both a local anaesthetic and a μ-opioid partial agonist. It is currently under development for use in surgical anasthesia, mainly administered by intrathecal infusion. It produces less respiratory depression than morphine, even at a high dose, and produces no respiratory depression at a low dose.

Sameridine is not currently a controlled drug, although if approved for medical use it will certainly be a prescription medicine, and it would probably be assigned to one of the controlled drug schedules in more restrictive jurisdictions such as Australia and the United States, especially if it were found to be addictive in animals.

References

External links 
 Substituted 4-phenyl-4-piperidinecarboxamides with both local anaesthetic and analgesic effect. US Patent 5227389
 Process for the preparation of Sameridine. US Patent 5756748

4-Phenylpiperidines
Synthetic opioids
Carboxamides
Mu-opioid receptor agonists